Samuel Bartlett may refer to:

 Samuel Bartlett (silversmith) (1752–1821), American silversmith
 Samuel L. Bartlett, American architect
 Samuel Colcord Bartlett (1817–1898), president of Dartmouth College